Moose maple may refer to two different species of maples:

Acer pensylvanicum, striped maple
Acer spicatum, mountain maple